alt.atheism is a Usenet newsgroup within the alt.* hierarchy that discusses atheism. The group was originally created on February 6, 1990  by a member of the alt.pagan newsgroup, to provide an alternative forum for the numerous discussions on atheism that were overwhelming the pagan group. A survey of usenet groups in 1994–1995 found that, among 70 groups discussing "consciousness, spirituality, and religion (broadly defined)", it was the group with the highest traffic volume.  writes that "atheist and freethought newsgroups" including alt.atheism have "done much to remove the sense of isolation felt by many with antireligious opinions".

Discussion matter
According to the alt.atheism FAQ, the purpose of the group is to discuss atheism and atheist topics such as the following:

 Whether it is reasonable to pretend to be religious in order to avoid upsetting your family 
Prayer in schools
Discrimination against atheists 
Sunday trading laws
The Satanic Child Abuse myth
Whether you should be an overt atheist or 'stay in the closet' 
How religious societies prey on new college students 
How to get rid of unwanted proselytizers
Whether religion is a danger to society and/or the individual 
Why people become atheists

 calls out another common discussion topic, the proper definition of atheism, as being "the thread that never dies on alt.atheism". The popularization of the "weak and strong atheism" terminology for different definitions of atheism has been credited to discussions on the alt.atheism newsgroup.

References

External links
Alt.atheism USENET group 
alt.atheism on google groups
alt-atheism Newsgroup FAQ
The Atheist Frontier

Atheism
Usenet alt.* hierarchy
Newsgroups